Homebelly Groove...Live is the second live album, and third release overall, by American jam band Spin Doctors, released in 1992.

Tracks 4, 5, and 6 are from a free radio concert for WNEW-FM, recorded at Lonestar Roadhouse in New York City on June 12, 1992. The remaining tracks were recorded on September 27, 1990 at Wetlands, New York City; tracks 2, 9, and 10 originally appeared on the band's EP Up for Grabs...Live.  An additional track from the Lonestar Roadhouse show, a performance of "What Time Is It?" featuring John Popper of Blues Traveler on harmonica, was released as the B-side of the single "Little Miss Can't Be Wrong."

Track listing

Personnel
Chris Barron – lead vocals
Eric Schenkman – guitar, backing vocals, lead vocals on "Off My Line"
Mark White – bass
Aaron Comess – drums
Roger Fox – flute on "Stepped on a Crack"

Production
Producers: Aaron Comess, Peter Denenberg, Frankie La Rocka, Eric Schenkman, Spin Doctors
Engineer: Peter Denenberg
Mixing: Frankie La Rocka
Mastering: Ted Jensen
Photography: Paul LaRaia
Art direction: Francesca Restrepo

Charts
Album

References

Spin Doctors albums
1992 live albums
Epic Records live albums